Winogradskyella aquimaris is a Gram-negative, aerobic and motile bacterium from the genus of Winogradskyella which has been isolated from seawater from the Geoje Island.

References

Flavobacteria
Bacteria described in 2012